Armando Evangelista Macedo Freitas  (born 3 November 1973), known as Armando Evangelista, is a Portuguese football manager and former player, currently in charge of F.C. Arouca.

Career
In the summer of 2010, three seasons after finishing his professional career as a player, Evangelista embarked on his managerial career by taking charge of Vitória S.C.'s under-19 team. After two seasons there, he departed to take charge of F.C. Vizela in the third tier.

Evangelista's stay with Vizela was short-lived, and in April 2013 he returned to Vitória to manage its reserve side in Segunda Liga until the end of the season. Despite claiming 9 points from a possible 21, he was unable to prevent relegation to the third tier. 

However, Evangelista's stay was prolonged and in 2013–14 season he led the Conquistadores to a first-place finish, and thus promotion back to the second tier. The  following season, he took them to 9th. He was subsequently named manager of the first team in June 2015 after Rui Vitória's departure from the club.

After just five league matches – a win and a loss each – and elimination from the UEFA Europa League qualifiers by Austria's SC Rheindorf Altach, Evangelista was dismissed on 21 September. In May 2016, he succeeded Nuno Capucho at Varzim S.C. in the second tier. He left on 13 October, with the team in 12th.

In September 2017, Evangelista returned to the second tier at 15th-placed F.C. Penafiel for the rest of the season. He then signed on for the following campaign, in which he took the team to 8th then left to be replaced by Miguel Leal.

Evangelista returned to work on 5 February 2020, at U.D. Vilafranquense, presiding over only four games as the season was curtailed due to the COVID-19 pandemic and then turning down a new deal. 

On 15 May 2020, Evangelista moved to second-tier newcomers F.C. Arouca. In his first season, Arouca came third and then defeated Rio Ave F.C. in the play-offs to reach the Primeira Liga for the first time since 2017. After a win over Moreirense F.C. the team made the Taça da Liga semi-finals for the first time the 2022–23 season, where they lost 2–1 to Sporting CP.

Managerial statistics

References

External links
 Armando Evangelista at footballzz.co.uk
 
 Armando Evangelista manager stats at ForaDeJogo

1973 births
Living people
Sportspeople from Guimarães
Portuguese footballers
Association football midfielders
Segunda Divisão players
Liga Portugal 2 players
G.D. Joane players
Associação Naval 1º de Maio players
S.C. Espinho players
Primeira Liga players
Moreirense F.C. players
Portuguese football managers
Primeira Liga managers
Liga Portugal 2 managers
Vitória S.C. managers
Varzim S.C. managers
F.C. Penafiel managers